Estadio Enrique Torres Belón is a multi-purpose stadium in Puno, Peru.  It is currently used by football team Alfonso Ugarte.  The stadium is built out of stone and has a capacity of 20,000 people. It is named after Senator Enrique Torres Belón from the Puno Region. The stadium is also the site of the Fiesta de la Candelaria every February.

External links
World Stadiums

E. Torres Belon
Buildings and structures in Puno Region